Eucosma krygeri is a species of moth belonging to the family Tortricidae.

It is native to Denmark.

References

Eucosmini
Moths described in 1937